Ken Gaines is a Houston area singer-songwriter & producer

In 2005 he was voted Singer Songwriter of the Year by the Academy of Texas Music and in 2007 his song "Real Men" was nominated Song of the Year at the Texas Music Awards.(1)

Ken Gaines has two ≈Studio CD's and one live cassette.
No One Else(Cassette) was released in 1991
Real Men (CD) was released in 2001
Catfish Moon (CD) was released in 2006 on Songdod record label

References

External links
 www.kengaines.com 

Living people
American male singer-songwriters
Place of birth missing (living people)
Year of birth missing (living people)
Musicians from Houston
Singer-songwriters from Texas